Ilyas Chouaref (born 12 December 2000) is a French professional footballer who plays as a winger for Swiss club Sion.

Club career
Chouaref is a youth product of LB Châteauroux. He made his debut with them in a 2–1 Ligue 2 loss to Le Havre ACon 4 December 2018. On 1 Octobe 2019, he signed a professional contract with the club.

On 12 June 2022, Chouaref transferred to Sion in Switzerland.

International career
Born in France, Chouaref is of Moroccan descent. He is a youth international for France.

Personal life
His elder half-brother Hamza Sakhi is also a footballer.

References

External links
 
 
 

2000 births
Living people
People from Châteauroux
Association football wingers
French footballers
France youth international footballers
French sportspeople of Moroccan descent
LB Châteauroux players
FC Sion players
Ligue 2 players
Swiss Super League players
Championnat National players
Championnat National 3 players
Footballers from Centre-Val de Loire
Sportspeople from Indre
French expatriate footballers
Expatriate footballers in Switzerland
French expatriate sportspeople in Switzerland